The Tibet women's football team is a national association football team controlled by the Tibet Women's Soccer (TWS), an organization of exiled Tibetans. Its current team manager is Gompo Dorjee.

Story 

In 2010, Tibetan schools in India launched for the first time an official football program for Tibetan to Dharamshala.

The US Cassie Childers, during his summer break trip to Dharamsala in India.
During the 2010 FIFA World Cup, she noticed that she was the only woman to pay attention to this international event.
Subsequently, at a photographic exhibition of the National Association of Tibetan sports, she is surprised that there are no women featured in the photographs, it was not just football, but all the sports.
Cassie Childers participant in driving the Tibetan youth and became the first coach of the Women's Football Team Tibet.

During the winter holidays, forty girls selected by their schools, have lived together for learning and practicing football and name the potential team captains, while participating in leadership training.
For the first training games, they are divided into two teams,  The Princesses Himalayan  and  Snowland United .

The program was founded in October 2011 to serve as a tool to empower Tibetan women in the refugee community.
Thirteen Tibetan schools in India and eighteen people were trained to best frame the 500 adolescents participating in the program.
The program begins in a training camp for a month, the 18 trainers form girls from each participating school to become leaders of the future new teams in both football training and empowerment.
During this period the camp invite professional coaches, sports psychologists, empower women teachers, physiotherapists, nurses and specialized sports coaches.
Eventually the female sports program of Tibet has trained 13 clubs in refugee settlements located in India.

A few days after the end of the 2011 FIFA Women's World Cup, 5 July, a team of seven Tibetan players met a Chinese team during the Discover Football Festival in Berlin.
Phuntsok Dolma, Sherab Dolma, Yandan Lhamo, Tenzin Norzom, Dasel Tenzin Sonam Tenzin Yangzom Palyang and then became the first Tibetan players to play a historic meeting in a foreign country.
The players were selected in a refugee camp in India by their coaches, Gompo Dorjee and Cassie Childers, for the simple reason that in China, they would never have had the right to set foot on a ball.
They confronted the players of the Shanghai University of Sport.
Some months before, Cassie Childers, the program manager and founder of the Football Association Women's Tibet, had decided with the team of a collaboration with the national Association of Tibetan sports.

The team of Tibetan women's football, created in 2011 in Dharamsala, India, was released thanks to international donations.
The first Tibetan Women's National Team is created, composed of 21 members. The first captain Ngawang Tsering Lhamo and Lhadon is the vice captain of the team.
The selection of the team of girls of the Tibetan football is chosen each winter in a training camp.

In 2012 May 26, Tibet faces Himachal Pradesh team before formatnum 8000 spectators, the match will end with a victory of two goals to nil, the first goal in the history of the women's team is Lhamo Kyi registered.
On September 9, the team played a second match which will result in a loss to Haryana.

In 2013 the team wins a match, the second ended in defeat, the latest in a draw.

In 2014 the team participates in Manipur Spring Football Festival first ladies Imphal. 
The first match starts on February 14 is finally defeated, the day the game is winning 4–2, is allowing Tibet to play the final against Manipur who finished in a draw, the two teams are named co-winner the tournament.

For the training session at Winter Camp 2014, a professional team is in place to form the best women's team Tibet.
Cassie Childers, General Manager & Responsible (communication, teamwork, leadership, self-esteem).
Shane Kidby of New Zealand served as head coach.
Johanna Kidby, New Zealand also joined as a fitness coach (yoga, circuit training, meditation, nutrition).
James Ryle of Ireland has used his training in hypnotherapy and other therapeutic models for group sessions and individual sports therapy.
Ngawang Namdol Coordinator with the TNSA.

In 2015, they participate in three friendly matches that end in four wins, a draw is a defeat.
Summer Camp 2015 begins with a new coach of the female Tibetan football team Gompo Dorjee, and the creation of a new headquarters in Clement Town India.

In 2016, the 28 and 30 April, two preparation matches are played, overwhelming victory against K.V School eight goals to nil and Woodstock School six goal to zero.

Goa Football Association (GFA) has introduced the female Goa Football Festival, the tournament starts on 4 for Tibet May 5 at Duler Stadium Mapusa.
Participating teams are the Tibet team Football Academy Spectrum Viva Goa and North Goa XI.
The Tibetan team players compose the Tibetan refugee community in India and Nepal.

Jamyang Choetso (Wangla), the tournament is designated team captain, Tenzin Dekyong is chosen as goalkeeper of the Tibet team. For the first time, the team selected a contingent of six players from the Nepal.
The team is coached by Gompo Dorjee, a former member of the National Men's Team Tibet, and managed by Cassie Childers.

In his first match Tibet's team wins against North Viva Goa 4–0 football stadium Duler.
Goals are marked by Jamyang Choetso the 6th and 33rd minutes, Ngawang Lhamo Dhondup Otsoe 11th and 40th.

The women's Tibetan team plays against Goa XI in the final on May 7
Goa dominates Tibet. The finale ends with 6–0, Goa Goa XI won the football feminine Festival 2016, Tibet finished in second place.

On June 18, for the first time in the history of Tibetan women's football, Lhamo Kyi first scorer of the team and the women's Tibet Jamyang Choetso (Wangla) Football captain female Tibet Tibetan became the first women to obtain a license AIFF D coach in Goa, India.

Achievements 
 Manipur to Football Tournament 2014: Co-Winner
 Goa Football Women Festival 2016: Finalist

Individual distinctions 
 Jamyang Choetso (Wangla): Price for the best scorer of the Manipur Football Tournament 2014.
 Marie Choeying Oehm: Prize for best midfielder of Manipur Football Tournament 2014.

Squad by year

Squad 2012 
Tenzin Dekyong
Tenzin Dolma 
Tenzin Lhamo
Choezom (cap)
Tsering Lhamo
Tenzing Choekyi
Marie Choeying Oehm
Jamyang Choetso Wangla
Kunchok Sangmo
Ngawang Oetso 
Tenzin Choezom
Lhamo Kyi
Rinzin Dolma 
Ngawang-Michael

Squad 2013 
Tenzin Yangchen
Tashi Dolma Talook
Dhe Ga
Tenzin Mozron
Rinzin Ngawang Zen
Rinzin dolma Tholing
Tenzin Kunsel
Tsering Lhamo
Phurbu Sangmo
Lingkyi Lhamo Choekyi
Tenzin yangchen
Abu Lhamo
Lhamo Kyi (cap)
Sonam Palyang
Tsering Dolma Gultsang
Jamyang Choetso

Squad 2014 
Gardienne:
Tenzin Dekyong
Défense:
Tenzin Dolma 
Tenzin Lhamo
Choezom (cap)
Tsering Lhamo (asst. captain)
Milieu terrain défensif:
Tenzing Choekyi
Marie Choeying Oehm
Milieu de terrain:
Wangla
Kunchok Sangmo
Ngawang Oetso
Attaque: 
Tenzin Choezom

Squad 2015 
Tenzin Yangzom
Sherab Dolma
Phuntsok Dolma
Lhamo Choekyi
Yandan Lhamo
Tenzin Dhekyong
Tenzin Chozom
Ngawang Oetso
Tashi Dolma
Tenzin Dasel
Tenzin Youdon
Sonam Palyang
Tenzin Tsentso
Tenzin Norzom
Tsering Lhamo

Squad 2016 
Yangdan Lhamo
Lhamo Kyi
Pema Choedon
Gopso Dhapz
Jamyang Choetso (cap)
Sonam Palyang
Tenzin Dekyong
Tsering Lhamo
Tenzin Lhamo
Ngawang
Tenzii Chonzom
Thinley Sangmo
Kalsang Kyi

Selected international matches

2012

2013

2014

2015

2016

2022

Top goalscorers

Coaches

Statistics correct as of 30 March 2016

References 

 "We can do anything boys can do" – Tibet's female football stars of tomorrow, Tibet Pos , January 9, 2013
 cassie childers starts soccer not for profit tibetan women,  Semester At Sea , May 5, 2013
 tibetan sports,  Tibetan sports , 2016
 Tibet women's soccer celebrates Successes Future Plans,  Contact , July 12, 2012
 Local teacher heads to india to start soccer program,  Willits news , June 1, 2011 and coach football Cassie Childers
 Tibets first girls soccer coaches,  Forbidden Dream Tibet , November 11, 2011
 China Tibet and football, So Foot , July 19, 2011
 Football for peace Tibetan women's team plays in Berlin,  Sport and dev , July 22, 2015
 voanews.com/content/tibet-china-womens-football-make-history/2852529.html Tibet china women's soccer make history, Voice of America , July 7, 2015
 Tibet women's soccer,  Tibet women's soccer , 2011
 first Tibetan women soccer team,  VOANews  , April 18, 2013.
 Tibet women's soccer,  TIBET'S SOCCER WOMEN , 2014
 -goa / tibetan-women's-soccer-team-to-play-in-goa,  Tibet express , April 2, 2016
 goa host women's soccer festival,  Arun football , May 3, 2016
 /2853266.html Tibet post easy 4–0 win over North Viva Goa in Goa Women's Football Tournament Festival,  webindia123 , May 5, 2016
 Goa-eves-crush-Tibet-side-to-clinch-title / 101760.html Dominant Goa eves crush Tibet side to clinch title,  goa Herald , May 8, 2016
 Tibetan women soccer team AIMS recognition by fifa 2017, Hindustan Times , June 11, 2013

Other sources

External links 
 

Sport in Tibet
Football in Tibet
Asian national and official selection-teams not affiliated to FIFA